Paraminabea is a genus of soft corals in the family Alcyoniidae.

Species
There are currently 10 species classified in this genus

Paraminabea acronocephala (Williams, 1992)
Paraminabea aldersladei (Williams, 1992)
Paraminabea arborea Williams & Alderslade, 1999
Paraminabea cosmarioides (Williams, 1992)
Paraminabea goslineri (Williams, 1992)
Paraminabea hongkongensis Lam & Morton, 2008
Paraminabea indica (Thomson & Henderson, 1905)
Paraminabea kosiensis (Williams, 1992)
Paraminabea robusta (Utinomi & Imahara, 1976)
Paraminabea rubeusa Benayahu & Fabricius, 2010

References

Alcyoniidae
Octocorallia genera